Carli Ellen Lloyd (born August 6, 1989) is an American professional volleyball player who played as a setter for the United States women's national volleyball team.  She played college women's volleyball at the University of California, Berkeley. Lloyd won bronze with the national team at the 2016 Rio Olympic Games.

Career
Lloyd played with the Italian club Yamamay Busto Arsizio from the 2011/12 to the 2012/13 season, winning during the season 2011/12 the League, Cup and Supercup also winning the CEV Cup.

With the Italian club Pomì Casalmaggiore  Lloyd won the Italian League and  the 2015-2016 Champions League.

Lloyd won the Best Setter individual award and the 2015 Pan-American Cup gold medal. She later won the 2015 Pan American Games gold medal and became Most Valuable Player and Best Setter. She was born in 1989.

Clubs
  Yamamay Busto Arsizio (2011–2013)
  Prosecco Doc-Imoco Conegliano (2013–2014)
  Lokomotiv Baku (2014–2015)
  Pomí Casalmaggiore (2015–2017)
  Hinode Barueri (2017–2018)
  Dentil Praia Clube (2018–2019)
  Eczacıbaşı VitrA (2019–2020)
  Pomí Casalmaggiore (2020–)

Awards

College
 2010 AVCA Player of the Year
 2010 NCAA Division I: Most Outstanding Player (regional)
 2010 NCAA Division I: Final Four All-Tournament Team
 2007 NCAA Division I: Madison Regional All-Tournament Team

Individual
 2015 Pan-American Cup "Best Setter"
 2015 Pan American Games "Best Setter"
 2015 Pan American Games "Most Valuable Player"
 2015-16 CEV Champions League "Best Setter"'
 2016 FIVB Club World Championship "Best Setter"''

Clubs
 2011-12 Italian Cup -  Champion, with Yamamay Busto Arsizio
 2011-12 Italian League -  Champion, with Yamamay Busto Arsizio
 2012 Italian Supercup -  Champion, with Yamamay Busto Arsizio
 2011–12 CEV Cup -  Champion, with Yamamay Busto Arsizio
 2012–13 CEV Champions League -  Bronze medal, with Yamamay Busto Arsizio
 2015 Italian Supercup -  Champion, with Pomì Casalmaggiore
 2015–16 CEV Champions League -  Champion, with Pomi Casalmaggiore
 2016 FIVB Club World Championship -  Runner-up, with Pomi Casalmaggiore
 2018 Minas Gerais Championship -  Runner-up, with Praia Clube
 2018 Brazilian Supercup -  Champion, with Praia Clube
 2018–19 Brazilian Superliga -  Runner-up, with Praia Clube

References

External links
 
 
 
 
 
 

1989 births
Living people
American women's volleyball players
Volleyball players at the 2011 Pan American Games
California Golden Bears women's volleyball players
Sportspeople from San Diego County, California
Volleyball players at the 2015 Pan American Games
Pan American Games bronze medalists for the United States
Pan American Games gold medalists for the United States
Volleyball players at the 2016 Summer Olympics
Olympic bronze medalists for the United States in volleyball
Medalists at the 2016 Summer Olympics
Expatriate volleyball players in Italy
American expatriate sportspeople in Italy
Lokomotiv Baku volleyball players
People from Fallbrook, California
Pan American Games medalists in volleyball
Setters (volleyball)
Expatriate volleyball players in Azerbaijan
Expatriate volleyball players in Brazil
Serie A1 (women's volleyball) players
Medalists at the 2011 Pan American Games
Medalists at the 2015 Pan American Games